Cyrtulus genticus is a species of predatory sea snail, a marine gastropod mollusc in the family Fasciolariidae, the spindle snails and tulip snails.

Distribution
This species occurs in the Tasman Sea off Australia.

References

 Powell A W B, New Zealand Mollusca, William Collins Publishers Ltd, Auckland, New Zealand 1979 
 Vermeij G.J. & Snyder M.A. (2018). Proposed genus-level classification of large species of Fusininae (Gastropoda, Fasciolariidae). Basteria. 82(4-6): 57-82.

External links
 Iredale, T. (1936). Australian molluscan notes, no. 2. Records of the Australian Museum. 19(5): 267-340, pls 20-24

genticus
Gastropods of New Zealand
Gastropods of Australia
Gastropods described in 1936